Victor Winding (30 January 1929 – 9 October 2014) was a British actor born in Lambeth, London. He appeared in "The Faceless Ones", a Doctor Who serial broadcast from April to May 1967 starring Patrick Troughton in which he played the character called Spencer, an airline pilot at Gatwick Airport, where his identity was taken over by a chameleon. He also appeared in seasons 1-3 of the tv series The Expert from 1968 to 1971 as series regular Det. Chief Inspector Fleming alongside star Marius Goring.

Biography

Winding was educated at Westminster Technical Institute and initially trained as a draughtsman but acted in amateur dramatics and taught drama at night school.  In 1958, aged 29, he joined Farnham Repertory Theatre.  The Castle Theatre was opened in 1941, and operated as a weekly repertory theatre. The English Classical Players' European tour was cut short by the outbreak of war and the actors decided to make their base in Farnham. Three years later in 1961 he worked with The Old Vic in London.  His first TV acting role was in Emergency – Ward 10 in 1957 playing the part of Dr Fairfax.

At the age of 34 in 1963 Winding acted in James Saunders' play Next Time I'll Sing To You, at the Criterion Theatre in London, England with actor Barry Foster, Liz Fraser, Peter McEnery, and Denys Graham in the cast.
 
His West End theatre performances included Poor Bitos by Jean Anouilh translated by Lucienne Hill at the Duke of York's Theatre, St. Martin's Lane, London in 1964 and also The Merchant of Venice.

His film roles included appearances in 3 Pete Walker horror movies, namely Frightmare (1974), House of Mortal Sin (1975), and Schizo (1976). His other films included The System (1964), The Medusa Touch (1978) as a senior police officer, and The Sailor's Return (1978) in which he played the ship's captain.

He made numerous TV appearances notably in the series The Flaxton Boys (in the series set in 1890) in which he played the character Barnaby Sweet (broadcast 1970), later also as Benjamin Sweet (both in the series set in 1928 and also 1945, broadcast 1971–1973).  He appeared in seasons 1-3 of the series The Expert from 1968 to 1971 as series regular Det. Chief Inspector Fleming alongside star Marius Goring. He also appeared in Yes, Prime Minister (as a policeman in the 1986 episode "The Key") and in The Saint.

Other TV included Crossroads (he played the character Victor Lee in several editions from 1978 to 1981), Warship, Bognor, Little and Large, Jemina Shore Investigates (1983), Angels (1983) playing the character Colin Simmonds, Shelley (playing the sergeant in the episode called "Owed to the Electrician" in 1984), Menace Unseen (1988), The Bill (1989) and Telly Addicts.

In 1992 he played the part of Kenneth Pigot in the TV series Crime Story.

Winding divorced from Rosalind Allen and had three daughters and a son: Celia, Kay, Julian and Jane.

Filmography

References

External links
 

1929 births
2014 deaths
Male actors from London
Alumni of the Westminster School of Art
English male stage actors
People from Lambeth
English male television actors